Alevism, Anatolian Alevism or Qizilbashism (Anadolu Aleviliği or Kızılbaşlık;) is a local Islamic tradition, whose adherents follow the mystical Islamic teachings of Haji Bektash Veli, who is supposed to have taught the teachings of the Twelve Imams. Differing from Sunnism and Usuli Twelver Shia, Alevis have no binding religious dogmas, and teachings are passed on by a spiritual leader as with sufi orders. They acknowledge the six articles of faith of Islam, but may differ regarding their interpretation. Adherents of Alevism are found primarily in Turkey and estimates of the percentage of Turkey's population that are Alevi include between 4% and 25%.

Etymology 

"Alevi" is generally explained as referring to Ali, the cousin and son-in-law of Muhammad. The name represents a Turkish form of the word ‘Alawi "of or pertaining to Ali".

A minority viewpoint is that of the Ishikists, who assert, "Alevi" was derived from "Alev" ("flame" in Turkish) in reference to fire which is extensively used in Alevi rituals. According to them the use of candles is based on Quran chapter 24, verses 35 and 36: "God is the Light of the heavens and the earth. The example of His light is like a niche within which there is a lamp, the lamp is encased in a glass, the glass is like a radiant planet, which is lit from a blessed olive tree that is neither of the east nor of the west, its oil nearly gives off light even if not touched by fire. Light upon light, God guides to His light whom He pleases. And God sets forth examples for the people, and God is aware of all things. (Lit is such a Light) in houses, which God has permitted to be raised to honor; for the celebration, in them, of His name: In them is He glorified in the mornings and in the evenings, (again and again).")

Beliefs 

According to scholar Soner Çağaptay, Alevism is a "relatively unstructured interpretation of Islam". Journalist Patrick Kingsley states that for some self-described Alevi, their religion is "simply a cultural identity, rather than a form of worship".

Many teachings are based on an orally transmitted tradition, traditionally kept secret from outsiders (but now widely accessible). Alevis commonly profess the Islamic shahada, but adding "Ali is the friend of God".

The basis for Alevis' most distinctive beliefs is found in the Buyruks (compiled writings and dialogues of Sheikh Safi-ad-din Ardabili, and other worthies). Also included are hymns (nefes) by figures such as Shah Ismail or Pir Sultan Abdal, stories of Hajji Bektash and other lore.

The Alevi beliefs among Turkish Alevis and Kurdish Alevis diverge as Kurdish Alevis put more emphasis on Pir Sultan Abdal than Haji Bektash Veli and Kurdish Alevism is rooted more in nature veneration.

God 

In Alevi cosmology, God is also called Al-Haqq (the Truth) or referred to as Allah. God created life, so the created world can reflect His Being.
Alevis believe in the unity of Allah, Muhammad, and Ali, but this is not a trinity composed of God and the historical figures of Muhammad and Ali. Rather, Muhammad and Ali are representations of Allah's light (and not of Allah himself), being neither independent from God, nor separate characteristics of Him.

In Alevi writings are many references to the unity of Muhammad and Ali, such as:

The phrase "For the love of Haqq–Muhammad–Ali" (Hakk–Muhammad–Ali aşkına) is common to several Alevi prayers.

Spirits and afterlife 
Alevis believe in the immortality of the soul, the literal existence of supernatural beings, including angels (melekler) and devils (şeytanlar), bad ones as encourager of human's evil desires (nefs), and jinn (cinler), as well as the evil eye.

Angels feature in Alevi cosmogony. Although there is no fixed creation narrative among Alevis, it is generally accepted that God created five archangels, who have been invited to the chamber of God. Inside they found a light representing the light of Muhammad and Ali. A recount of the Quranic story, one of the archangels refused to prostrate before the light, arguing, that the light is a created body just like him and therefore inappropriate to worship. He remains at God's service, but rejects the final test and turns back to darkness. From this primordial decline, the devil's enmity towards Adam emerged. (The archangels constitute of the same four archangels as within orthodox Islam. The fifth archangel namely Azazil fell from grace, thus not included among the canonical archangels apart from this story).

Another story features the archangel Gabriel (Cebrail), who is asked by God, who they are. Gabriel answers: "I am I and you are you". Gabriel gets punished for his haughty answer and is sent away, until Ali reveals a secret to him. When God asks him again, he answers: "You are the creator and I am your creation". Afterwards, Gabriel was accepted and introduced to Muhammad and Ali.

Scriptures and prophets 
Alevis acknowledge the four revealed scriptures also recognized in Islam: the Tawrat (Torah), the Zabur (Psalms), the Injil (Gospel), and the Quran. Additionally, Alevis are not opposed to looking to other religious books outside the four major ones as sources for their beliefs including Hadiths, Nahjul Balagha and Buyruks. Alevism also acknowledges the Islamic prophet Mohammed. Unlike Sunnis and Shia, Alevis do not regard interpretations of the Quran today as binding or infallible, since the true meaning the Quran is considered to be taken as a secret by Ali and must be taught by a teacher, who transmits the teachings of Ali (Buyruk) to his disciple.

Twelve Imams 

The Twelve Imams are part of another common Alevi belief. Each Imam represents a different aspect of the world. They are realized as twelve services or On İki Hizmet which are performed by members of the Alevi community. Each Imam is believed to be a reflection of Ali ibn Abu Talib, the first Imam of the Shi'ites, and there are references to the "First Ali" (Birinci Ali), Imam Hasan the "Second 'Ali" (İkinci Ali), and so on up to the "Twelfth 'Ali" (Onikinci Ali), Imam Mehdi. The Twelfth Imam is hidden and represents the Messianic Age.

Plurality 
The plurality in nature is attributed to the infinite potential energy of Kull-i Nafs when it takes corporeal form as it descends into being from Allah. During the Cem ceremony, the cantor or aşık sings:

"All of us alive or lifeless are from one, this is ineffable, Sultan.
For to love and to fall in love has been my fate from time immemorial."

This is sung as a reminder that the reason for creation is love, so that the followers may know themselves and each other and that they may love that which they know.

Perfect human being 

Linked to the concept of the Prototypical Human is that of the al-Insān al-Kāmil "Perfect Human Being". Although it is common to refer to Ali and Haji Bektash Veli or the other Alevi saints as manifestations of the perfect human being, the Perfect Human Being is also identified with our true identity as pure consciousness, hence the Qur'anic concept of human beings not having original sin, consciousness being pure and perfect.  The human task is to fully realize this state while still in material human form.

The perfect human being is also defined in practical terms, as one who is in full moral control of his or her hands, tongue and loins (eline diline beline sahip); treats all kinds of people equally (yetmiş iki millete aynı gözle bakar); and serves the interests of others. One who has achieved this kind of enlightenment is also called eren or münevver "enlightened".

Creed and jurisprudence 

Sources differ on how important formal doctrine is among contemporary Alevi. According to scholar Russell Powell there is a tradition of informal "Dede" courts within the Alevi society, but regarding Islamic jurisprudence or fiqh there has been "little scholarship on Alevi influences" in it.

 "The Alevi-Turks" has a unique belief system tracing back to Kaysanites and Khurramites which are considered Ghulat Shia Islam by some. According to Turkish scholar Abdülbaki Gölpinarli, the Qizilbash (Red-Heads) of the 16th century – a religious and political movement in Azerbaijan that helped to establish the Safavid dynasty – were spiritual descendants of the Khurramites.
 Among the members of the "Qizilbash-Tariqa" who are considered as a sub-sect of the Alevis, two figures firstly Abu Muslim Khorasani , who assisted Abbasid Caliphate to beat the Umayyad Caliphate but later eliminated and murdered by Caliph Al-Mansur and secondly Babak Khorramdin who incited a rebellion against Abbasid Caliphate and consequently was killed by Caliph al-Mu'tasim, are highly respected. This belief provides strong clues about their Kaysanites Shia and Khurramites origins. In addition, Safaviyya Tariqa leader Shāh Ismāʿīl is a highly regarded individual in the belief of Alevi-Qizilbash-Tariqa associating them with the Imamah (Shia Twelver doctrine) conviction of Twelver Shia Islam.

Practices 

The Alevi spiritual path (yol) is commonly understood to take place through four major life-stages, or "gates".
These may be further subdivided into "four gates, forty levels" (Dört Kapı Kırk Makam). The first gate (religious law) is considered elementary (and this may be perceived as subtle criticism of other Muslim traditions).

The following are major crimes that cause an Alevi to be declared düşkün (shunned):
 killing a person
 committing adultery
 divorcing one's wife without a just reason
 stealing
 backbiting/gossiping

Most Alevi activity takes place in the context of the second gate (spiritual brotherhood), during which one submits to a living spiritual guide (dede, pir, mürşid). The existence of the third and fourth gates is mostly theoretical, though some older Alevis have apparently received initiation into the third.

Dede 

A Dede (literally meaning grandfather) is a traditional leader that is claimed to be from the lineage of Muhammad that performs ritual baptisms for newborns, officiates at funerals, and organises weekly gatherings at cemevis.

Cem and Cemevi 

Alevi religious, cultural and other social activities take place in assembly houses (Cemevi). The ceremony's prototype is the Muhammad's nocturnal ascent into heaven, where he beheld a gathering of forty saints (Kırklar Meclisi), and the Divine Reality made manifest in their leader, Ali.

The Cem ceremony features music, singing, and dancing (Samāh) in which both women and men participate. Rituals are performed in Turkish, Zazaki, Kurmanji and other local languages.

Bağlama

During the Cem ceremony the Âşık plays the Bağlama whilst singing spiritual songs, some of which are centuries old and well known amongst Alevis. Every song, called a Nefes, has spiritual meaning and aims to teach the participants important lessons. One such song goes thus:

"Learn from your mistakes and be knowledgeable,
Don't look for faults in others,
Look at 73 different people in the same way,
God loves and created them all, so don't say anything against them."

Samāh
A family of ritual dances characterized by turning and swirling, is an inseparable part of any cem. Samāh is performed by men and women together, to the accompaniment of the Bağlama. The dances symbolize (for example) the revolution of the planets around the Sun (by man and woman turning in circles), and the putting off of one's self and uniting with God.

Görgü Cemi
The Rite of Integration (görgü cemi) is a complex ritual occasion in which a variety of tasks are allotted to incumbents bound together by extrafamilial brotherhood (müsahiplik), who undertake a dramatization of unity and integration under the direction of the spiritual leader (dede).

Dem
The love of the creator for the created and vice versa is symbolised in the Cem ceremony by the use of fruit juice and/or red wine [Dem] which represents the intoxication of the lover in the beloved. During the ceremony Dem is one of the twelve duties of the participants. (see above)

Sohbet
At the closing of the cem ceremony the Dede who leads the ceremony engages the participants in a discussion (chat), this discussion is called a sohbet.

Twelve services 
There are twelve services performed by the twelve ministers of the cem.
 Dede: This is the leader of the Cem who represents Muhammad and Ali. The Dede receives confession from the attendees at the beginning of the ceremony. He also leads funerals, Müsahiplik, marriage ceremonies and circumcisions. The status of Dede is hereditary and he must be a descendant of Ali and Fatima.
 Rehber: This position represents Husayn. The Rehber is a guide to the faithful and works closely with the Dede in the community.
 Gözcü: This position represents Abu Dharr al-Ghifari. S/he is the assistant to the Rehber. S/he is the Cem keeper responsible for keeping the faithful calm.
 Çerağcı: This position represents Jabir ibn Abd-Allah and s/he is the light-keeper responsible for maintaining the light traditionally given by a lamp or candles.
 Zakir: This position represents Bilal ibn al-Harith. S/he plays the bağlama and recites songs and prayers.
 Süpürgeci: This position represents Salman the Persian. S/he is responsible for cleaning the Cemevi hall and symbolically sweeping the carpets during the Cem.
 Meydancı: This position represents Hudhayfah ibn al-Yaman.
 Niyazcı: this position represents Muhammad ibn Maslamah. S/he is responsible for distributing the sacred meal.
 İbrikçi: this position represents Kamber. S/he is responsible for washing the hands of the attendees.
 Kapıcı: this position represents Ghulam Kaysan. S/he is responsible for calling the faithful to the Cem.
 Peyikçi: this position represents Amri Ayyari.
 Sakacı: represents Ammar ibn Yasir. Responsible for the distribution of water, sherbet (sharbat), milk etc..

Festivals 

Alevis celebrate and commemorate the birth of Ali, his wedding with Fatima, the rescue of Yusuf from the well, and the creation of the world on this day. Various cem ceremonies and special programs are held.

Mourning of Muharram 

The Muslim month of Muharram begins 20 days after Eid ul-Adha. Alevis observe a fast for the first twelve days. This is called "", "", "", "" or "" (Mourning of Muharram). This culminates in the festival of Ashura, which commemorates the martyrdom of Husayn at Karbala. The fast is broken with a special dish (also called aşure) prepared from a variety (often twelve) of fruits, nuts, and grains. Many events are associated with this celebration, including the salvation of Husayn's son Ali ibn Husayn from the massacre at Karbala, thus allowing the bloodline of the family of Muhammad to continue.

Hıdırellez 

Hıdırellez honors the mysterious figure Khidr who is sometimes identified with Elijah (Ilyas), and is said to have drunk of the water of life. Some hold that Khidr comes to the rescue of those in distress on land, while Elijah helps those at sea; and that they meet at a rose tree in the evening of every 6 May. The festival is also celebrated in parts of the Balkans by the name of "Erdelez," where it falls on the same day as Đurđevdan or St. George's Day.

Khidr is also honored with a three-day fast in mid-February called Hızır Orucu. In addition to avoiding any sort of comfort or enjoyment, Alevis also abstain from food and water for the entire day, though they do drink liquids other than water during the evening.

Note that the dates of the Khidr holidays can differ among Alevis, most of whom use a lunar calendar, but some a solar calendar.

Müsahiplik 

Müsahiplik (roughly, "Companionship") is a covenant relationship between two men of the same age, preferably along with their wives. In a ceremony in the presence of a dede the partners make a lifelong commitment to care for the spiritual, emotional, and physical needs of each other and their children. The ties between couples who have made this commitment is at least as strong as it is for blood relatives, so much so that müsahiplik is often called spiritual brotherhood (manevi kardeşlik). The children of covenanted couples may not marry.

Krisztina Kehl-Bodrogi reports that the  identify müsahiplik with the first gate (şeriat), since they regard it as a precondition for the second (tarikat). Those who attain to the third gate (marifat, "gnosis") must have been in a müsahiplik relationship for at least twelve years. Entry into the third gate dissolves the müsahiplik relationship (which otherwise persists unto death), in a ceremony called Öz Verme Âyini ("ceremony of giving up the self").

The value corresponding to the second gate (and necessary to enter the third) is âşinalık ("intimacy," perhaps with God). Its counterpart for the third gate is called peşinelik; for the fourth gate (hâkikat, Ultimate Truth), cıngıldaşlık or cengildeşlik (translations uncertain).

Folk practices 

Many folk practices may be identified, though few of them are specific to the Alevis. In this connection, scholar Martin van Bruinessen notes a sign from Turkey's Ministry of Religion, attached to Istanbul's shrine of Eyüp Sultan, which presents...a long list of ‘superstitious’ practices that are emphatically declared to be non-Islamic and objectionable, such as lighting candles or placing ‘wishing stones’ on the tomb, tying pieces of cloth to the shrine or to the trees in front of it, throwing money on the tomb, asking the dead directly for help, circling seven times around the trees in the courtyard or pressing one’s face against the walls of the türbe in the hope of a supernatural cure, tying beads to the shrine and expecting supernatural support from them, sacrificing roosters or turkeys as a vow to the shrine. The list is probably an inventory of common local practices the authorities wish to prevent from re-emerging.Other, similar practices include kissing door frames of holy rooms; not stepping on the threshold of holy buildings; seeking prayers from reputed healers; and making lokma and sharing it with others.

Ziyarat to sacred places 

Performing ziyarat and du'a at the tombs of Alevi-Bektashi saints or pirs is quite common. Some of the most frequently visited sites are the shrines of Şahkulu and Karacaahmet (both in Istanbul), Abdal Musa (Antalya), Battal Gazi (Eskişehir), the annual celebrations held at Hacıbektaş (16 August) and Sivas (the Pir Sultan Abdal Kültür Etkinlikleri, 23–24 June).

In contrast with the traditional secrecy of the Cem ceremony ritual, the events at these cultural centers and sites are open to the public. In the case of the Hacibektaş celebration, since 1990 the activities there have been taken over by Turkey's Ministry of Culture in the interest of promoting tourism and Turkish patriotism rather than Alevi spirituality.

Some Alevis make pilgrimages to mountains and other natural sites believed to be imbued with holiness.

Almsgiving 

Alevis are expected to give Zakat but not in the Orthodox-Islamic sense rather there is no set formula or prescribed amount for annual charitable donation as there is in Orthodox Islam (2.5% of possessions above a certain minimum). Rather, they are expected to give the 'excess' according to Qur'an verse 2:219. A common method of Alevi almsgiving is through donating food (especially sacrificial animals) to be shared with worshippers and guests. Alevis also donate money to be used to help the poor, to support the religious, educational and cultural activities of Alevi centers and organizations (dergâh, vakıf, dernek), and to provide scholarships for students.

History

Seljuk period 

During the great Turkish expansion from Central Asia into Iran and Anatolia in the Seljuk period (11–12th centuries), Turkmen and Kurdish nomad tribes accepted a Sufi and pro-Ali form of Islam that co-existed with some of their pre-Islamic customs. Their conversion to Islam in this period was achieved largely through the efforts not of textual scholars (ulema) expounding the finer points of Koranic exegesis and shari‘a law, but by charismatic Sufi dervishes a Kurdish belief whose cult of Muslim saint worship, mystical divination and millenarianism spoke more directly to the steppe mindset. These tribes dominated Anatolia for centuries with their religious warriors (ghazi) spearheading the drive against Byzantines and Crusaders.

Modern period

Ottoman period 

As in Khorasan and West Asia before, the Turkmens who spearheaded the Ottomans’ drive into the Balkans and West Asia were more inspired by a vaguely Shiite folk Islam than by formal religion. Many times, Ottoman campaigns were
accompanied or guided by Bektaşi dervishes, spiritual heirs of the 13th century Sufi saint Haji Bektash Veli, himself a native of Khorasan. After the conquest of Constantinople in 1453, the Ottoman state became increasingly determined to assert its fiscal but also its juridical and political control over the farthest reaches of the Empire. The resulting Qizilbash revolts, a series of millenarian anti-state uprisings by the heterodox Turkmen population of Anatolia that culminated in the establishment of a militantly Shiite rival state in neighbouring Iran. The Ottoman Empire later proclaimed themselves its defenders against the Safavid Shia state and related sects. This created a gap between the Sunni Ottoman ruling elite and the Alevi Anatolian population. Anatolia became a battlefield between Safavids and Ottomans, each determined to include it in their empire.

Republic of Turkey
According to Eren Sarı, Alevi saw Kemal Atatürk as a Mahdi "savior sent to save them from the Sunni Ottoman yoke". However, pogroms against Alevi did not cease after the establishment of Atatürk's republic. In attacks against leftists in the 1970s, ultranationalists and reactionaries killed many Alevis. Malatya in 1978, Maraş in 1979, and Çorum in 1980 witnessed the murder of hundreds of Alevis, the torching of hundreds of homes, and lootings.

Alevis have been victims of pogroms during both Ottoman times and under the Turkish republic up until the 1993 Sivas massacre.

{| class="navbox" style="float:center; margin: 2ex 0 0.6em 0.5em; width: 8em; line-height:111%;" 
!The schematic history of the development of the Imāmī-Alevism from other Shī‘ah Muslim sects 
|-
|

Organization
In contrast to the Bektashi tariqa, which like other Sufi orders is based on a silsila "initiatory chain or lineage" of teachers and their students, Alevi leaders succeed to their role on the basis of family descent. Perhaps ten percent of Alevis belong to a religious elite called ocak "hearth", indicating descent from Ali and/or various other saints and heroes. Ocak members are called ocakzades or "sons of the hearth". This system apparently originated with Safavid Persia.

Alevi leaders are variously called murshid, pir, rehber or dede. Groups that conceive of these as ranks of a hierarchy (as in the Bektashi tariqa) disagree as to the order. The last of these, dede "grandfather", is the term preferred by the scholarly literature. Ocakzades may attain to the position of dede on the basis of selection (by a father from among several sons), character, and learning. In contrast to Alevi rhetoric on the equality of the sexes, it is generally assumed that only males may fill such leadership roles.

Traditionally Dedes did not merely lead rituals, but led their communities, often in conjunction with local notables such as the ağas (large landowners) of the Dersim Region. They also acted as judges or arbiters, presiding over village courts called Düşkünlük Meydanı.

Ordinary Alevi would owe allegiance to a particular dede lineage (but not others) on the basis of pre-existing family or village relations. Some fall instead under the authority of Bektashi dargah (lodges).

In the wake of 20th century urbanization (which removed young laborers from the villages) and socialist influence (which looked upon the Dedes with suspicion), the old hierarchy has largely broken down. Many Dedes now receive salaries from Alevi cultural centers, which arguably subordinates their role. Such centers no longer feature community business or deliberation, such as the old ritual of reconciliation, but emphasize musical and dance performance to the exclusion of these. Dedes are now approached on a voluntary basis, and their role has become more circumscribed – limited to religious rituals, research, and giving advice.

According to John Shindeldecker "Alevis are proud to point out that they are monogamous, Alevi women are encouraged to get the best education they can, and Alevi women are free to go into any occupation they choose."

Relationship with other Shia groups 
Alevis are classified as a sect of Shia Islam, and Ayatollah Ruhollah Khomeini decreed Alevis to be part of the Shia fold in the 1970s. However, Alevi philosophies, customs, and rituals are appreciably different than those of mainstream, orthodox Ja'fari-Twelver Shi‘ah. According to Alevis, Ali and Muhammad are likened to the two sides of a coin, or the two halves of an apple.

Relationship with Alawites
Similarities with the Alawite sect in Syria exist. Both are viewed as heterodox, syncretic Islamic minorities, whose names both mean "devoted to Ali," (the son-in-law and cousin of the Islamic Prophet Muhammad, and fourth caliph following Muhammad as leader of the Muslims), and are located primarily in the Eastern Mediterranean. Like mainstream Shia they are known as "Twelvers" as they both recognize the Twelve Imams.

How the two minorities relate is disputed. According to scholar Marianne Aringberg-Laanatza, "the Turkish Alevis... do not relate themselves in any way to the Alawites in Syria." However journalist Jeffrey Gettlemand claims that both Alevi and the less than one million Alawite minority in Turkey "seem to be solidly behind Syria’s embattled strongman, Bashar al-Assad" and leery of Syrian Sunni rebels. Deutsche Welle journalist Dorian Jones states that Turkish Alevis are suspicious of the anti-Assad uprising in Syria. "They are worried of the repercussions for Alawites there, as well as for themselves."

Some sources (Martin van Bruinessen and Jamal Shah) mistake Alawites living in Turkey to be Alevis (calling Alevis "a blanket term for a large number of different heterodox communities"), but others do not, giving a list of the differences between the two groups.
These include their liturgical languages (Turkish or Kurdish for Alevi, Arabic for Alawites). Opposing political nationalism, with Alawites supporting their ruling dictatorship and considering Turks (including Alevis) an "opponent" of its Arab "historic interests". (Even Kurdish and Balkan Alevi populations pray in Turkish.) Unlike Alevis, Alawites not only traditionally lack mosques but do not maintain their own places for worship, except for shrines to their leaders. Alevi "possess an extensive and widely-read religious literature, mainly composed of spiritual songs, poems, and epic verse." Their origins are also different: The Alawite faith was founded in the ninth century by Abu Shuayb Muhammad ibn Nusayr. Alevism started in the 14th century by mystical Islamic dissenters in Central Asia, and represent more of a movement rather than a sect.

Relationship with majority Sunnis 
The relationship between Alevis and Sunnis is one of mutual suspicion and prejudice dating back to the Ottoman period. Hundreds of Alevis were murdered in sectarian violence in the years that preceded the 1980 coup, and as late as the 1990s dozens were killed with impunity. While pogroms have not occurred since then, Erdogan has declared “a cemevi is not a place of worship, it is a center for cultural activities. Muslims should only have one place of worship.”

Alevis claim that they have been subject to intolerant Sunni "nationalism" that has been unwilling to recognize Alevi "uniqueness."

Sufi elements in Alevism 

Despite this essentially Shi‘i orientation, much of Aleviness' mystical language is inspired by Sufi traditions. For example, the Alevi concept of God is derived from the philosophy of Ibn Arabi and involves a chain of emanation from God, to spiritual man, earthly man, animals, plants, and minerals. The goal of spiritual life is to follow this path in the reverse direction, to unity with God, or Haqq (Reality, Truth). From the highest perspective, all is God (see Wahdat-ul-Wujood). Alevis admire Mansur Al-Hallaj, a 10th-century Sufi who was accused of blasphemy and subsequently executed in Baghdad for saying "I am the Truth" (Ana al-Haqq).

There is some tension between folk tradition Aleviness and the Bektashi Order, which is a Sufi order founded on Alevi beliefs. In certain Turkish communities other Sufi orders (the Halveti-Jerrahi and some of the Rifa'i) have incorporated significant Alevi influence.

Demographics 

Most Alevi live in Turkey, where they are a minority and Sunni Muslims the majority. The size of the Alevi population is likewise disputed, but most estimates place them somewhere between 5 and 10 million people or about 10% of the population. Estimates of the percentage of Turkey's population that are Alevi include between 4% and 15%. Scattered minorities live in Bulgaria, Cyprus, the Caucasus, Greece, Iran and the diaspora. In the 2021 United Kingdom census, Alevism was discovered to be the eighth largest religion in England and Wales, after Christianity, Islam, Hinduism, Sikhism, Buddhism, Judaism and Paganism.

Different estimations exist on the ethnic composition of the Alevi population. Although Turks are probably the largest ethnic group among Alevis considering their historical towns and cities. While Dressler stated in 2008 that about a third of the Alevi population is Kurdish, Hamza Aksüt argued that the majority is Kurdish when many groups he considers as Alevis such as the Yarsanis are combined. Most Alevis come from Kizilbash or Bektashi origin, according to Minorityrights.org. The Alevis (Kizilbash) are traditionally predominantly rural and acquire identity by parentage. Bektashis, however, are predominantly urban, and formally claim that membership is open to any Muslim. The groups are separately organized, but subscribe to "virtually the same system of beliefs".

Population estimates
The Alevi population has been estimated as follows:
 Approximately 20 million according to Daily Sabah, newspaper close to the government in 2021.
 12,521,000 according to Sabahat Akkiraz, an MP from CHP.
 "approx. 15 million..." —Krisztina Kehl-Bodrogi.
 ~4-5% of total population of Turkey —Konda Research (2021).
 In Turkey, 15% of Turkey's population (approx. 10.6 million) — Shankland (2006).
20 to 25 million according to Minority Rights Group.
 There is a native 3,000 Alevi community in Western Thrace, Greece.

 The predominant religion of the Äynu people of western China is Alevism. There are estimated to be around 30-50 thousand Äynu, mostly located on the fringe of the Taklamakan Desert.
 25,672 Alevi live in England and Wales.

Social groups 
A Turkish scholar working in France has distinguished four main groups among contemporary Alevis, which cautiously show their distinctive features in modern Turkey.

The first group, who form a majority of the Alevi population, regard themselves as true Muslims and are prepared to cooperate with the state. It adheres to the way of Jafar as-Sadiq, the Sixth Imam of Shia Islam. This group's concept of God is the same as Orthodox Islam, and like their Shia counterparts they reject the first three chosen Caliphs, whom Sunni accept as legitimate, and accept only Ali as the actual and true Caliph.

The second group, which has the second most following among Alevis, are said to be under the active influence of the official Iranian Shia and to be confirmed adherents of the Twelver branch of Shia Islam and they reject the teachings of Bektashism Tariqa. They follow the Ja'fari jurisprudence and oppose secular state power.

The third group a minority belief held by the Alevis is mainly represented by people who belong to the political left and presumed the Aleviness just as an outlook on the individual human life rather than a religious conviction by persistently renouncing the ties of Alevism with Twelver political branch of Shia Islam. The followers of this congregation, who later turned out to be the very stern defenders of Erdoğan Çınar, hold ritual unions of a religious character and have established cultural associations named after Pir Sultan Abdal as well. According to their philosophy, human being should enjoy a central role reminiscent of the doctrine of Khurramites, and as illustrated by Hurufi phrase of God is Man quoted above in the context of the Trinity.

The fourth who adopted some aspirations of Christian mysticism, is more directed towards heterodox mysticism and stands closer to the Hajji Bektashi Brotherhood. According to the philosophy developed by this congregation, Christian mystic St Francis of Assisi and Hindu Mahatma Gandhi are supposedly considered better believers of God than many Muslims.

Influences of the Muslim sects on the Alevī faith throughout Anatolia and the Balkans

Wahdat al-Mawjud 

 
Bektashism places much emphasis on the concept of Wahdat al-Mawjud وحدة الوجود, the "Unity of Being" that was formulated by Ibn Arabi. Bektashism is also heavily permeated with Shiite concepts, such as the marked veneration of Ali, the Twelve Imams, and the ritual commemoration of Ashurah marking the Battle of Karbala. The old Persian holiday of Nowruz is celebrated by Bektashis as Imam Ali's birthday.
 
In keeping with the central belief of Wahdat Al-Mawjud the Bektashi see reality contained in Haqq-Muhammad-Ali, a single unified entity. Bektashi do not consider this a form of trinity. There are many other practices and ceremonies that share similarity with other faiths, such as a ritual meal (muhabbet) and yearly confession of sins to a baba (magfirat-i zunub مغفرة الذنوب). Bektashis base their practices and rituals on their non-orthodox and mystical interpretation and understanding of the Qur'an and the prophetic practice (Sunnah). They have no written doctrine specific to them, thus rules and rituals may differ depending on under whose influence one has been taught. Bektashis generally revere Sufi mystics outside of their own order, such as Ibn Arabi, Al-Ghazali and Jelalludin Rumi who are close in spirit to them.

Mysticism 

Bektashism is initiatic and members must traverse various levels or ranks as they progress along the spiritual path to the Reality. First level members are called aşıks عاشق. They are those who, while not having taken initiation into the order, are nevertheless drawn to it. Following initiation (called nasip) one becomes a mühip محب. After some time as a mühip, one can take further vows and become a dervish. The next level above dervish is that of baba. The baba (lit. father) is considered to be the head of a tekke and qualified to give spiritual guidance (irshad إرشاد). Above the baba is the rank of halife-baba (or dede, grandfather). Traditionally there were twelve of these, the most senior being the "dedebaba" (great-grandfather). The dedebaba was considered to be the highest ranking authority in the Bektashi Order. Traditionally the residence of the dedebaba was the Pir Evi (The Saint's Home) which was located in the shrine of Hajji Bektash Wali in the central Anatolian town of Hacıbektaş (Solucakarahüyük).

See also
 Ashura
 Duzgin Bawo
 Religious humanism
 Shi'a view of Ali

References

Bibliography 

General introductions
 
 Engin, Ismail & Franz, Erhard (2000). Aleviler / Alewiten. Cilt 1 Band: Kimlik ve Tarih / Identität und Geschichte. Hamburg: Deutsches Orient Institut (Mitteilungen Band 59/2000). 
 Engin, Ismail & Franz, Erhard (2001). Aleviler / Alewiten. Cilt 2 Band: İnanç ve Gelenekler / Glaube und Traditionen. Hamburg: Deutsches Orient Institut (Mitteilungen Band 60/2001). 
 Engin, Ismail & Franz, Erhard (2001). Aleviler / Alewiten. Cilt 3 Band: Siyaset ve Örgütler / Politik und Organisationen. Hamburg: Deutsches Orient Institut (Mitteilungen Band 61/2001). 
 Kehl-Bodrogi, Krisztina (1992). Die Kizilbas/Aleviten. Untersuchungen über eine esoterische Glaubensgemeinschaft in Anatolien. Die Welt des Islams, (New Series), Vol. 32, No. 1.
 Kitsikis, Dimitri (1999). Multiculturalism in the Ottoman Empire : The Alevi Religious and Cultural Community, in P. Savard & B. Vigezzi eds. Multiculturalism and the History of International Relations Milano: Edizioni Unicopli.
 Kjeilen, Tore (undated). "Alevism," in the (online) Encyclopedia of the Orient.
 Shankland, David (2003). The Alevis in Turkey: The Emergence of a Secular Islamic Tradition. Curzon Press.
 Shindeldecker, John (1996). Turkish Alevis Today. Istanbul: Sahkulu.
 White, Paul J., & Joost Jongerden (eds.) (2003). Turkey’s Alevi Enigma: A Comprehensive Overview. Leiden: Brill.
 Yaman, Ali & Aykan Erdemir (2006). Alevism-Bektashism: A Brief Introduction, London: England Alevi Cultural Centre & Cem Evi. 
 Zeidan, David (1999) "The Alevi of Anatolia." Middle East Review of International Affairs 3/4.

Kurdish Alevis
 Bumke, Peter (1979). "Kizilbaş-Kurden in Dersim (Tunceli, Türkei). Marginalität und Häresie." Anthropos 74, 530–548.
 Gezik, Erdal (2000), Etnik Politik Dinsel Sorunlar Baglaminda Alevi Kurtler, Ankara.
 Van Bruinessen, Martin (1997). "Aslını inkar eden haramzadedir! The Debate on the Kurdish Ethnic Identity of the Kurdish Alevis." In K. Kehl-Bodrogi, B. Kellner-Heinkele, & A. Otter-Beaujean (eds), Syncretistic Religious Communities in the Near East (Leiden: Brill).
 Van Bruinessen, Martin (1996). Kurds, Turks, and the Alevi revival in Turkey. Middle East Report, No. 200, pp. 7–10. (NB: The online version is expanded from its original publication.)
 White, Paul J. (2003), "The Debate on the Identity of ‘Alevi Kurds’." In: Paul J. White/Joost Jongerden (eds.) Turkey’s Alevi Enigma: A Comprehensive Overview. Leiden: Brill, pp. 17–32.

Alevi / Bektashi history
 Birge, John Kingsley (1937). The Bektashi order of dervishes, London and Hartford.
 Brown, John P. (1868), The Dervishes; or, Oriental Spiritualism.
 Küçük, Hülya (2002) The Roles of the Bektashis in Turkey’s National Struggle. Leiden: Brill.
 Mélikoff, Irène (1998). Hadji Bektach: Un mythe et ses avatars. Genèse et évolution du soufisme populaire en Turquie. Leiden: Islamic History and Civilization, Studies and Texts, volume 20, .
 Shankland, David (1994). "Social Change and Culture: Responses to Modernization in an Alevi Village in Anatolia."In C.N. Hann, ed., When History Accelerates: Essays on Rapid Social Change, Complexity, and Creativity. London: Athlone Press.
 Yaman, Ali (undated). "Kizilbash Alevi Dedes." (Based on his MA thesis for Istanbul University.)

Ghulat sects in general
 Halm, H. (1982). Die Islamische gnosis: Die extreme Schia und die Alawiten. Zürich.
 Krisztina Kehl-Bodrogi, Krisztina, & Barbara Kellner-Heinkele, Anke Otter-Beaujean, eds. (1997) Syncretistic Religious Communities in the Near East. Leiden: Brill, pp. 11–18.
 Moosa, Matti (1988). Extremist Shiites: The Ghulat Sects, Syracuse University Press.
 Van Bruinessen, Martin (2005). "Religious practices in the Turco-Iranian world: continuity and change." French translation published as: "Les pratiques religieuses dans le monde turco-iranien: changements et continuités", Cahiers d'Études sur la Méditerranée Orientale et le Monde Turco-Iranien, no. 39–40, 101–121.

Alevi Identity
 Erdemir, Aykan (2005). "Tradition and Modernity: Alevis' Ambiguous Terms and Turkey's Ambivalent Subjects", Middle Eastern Studies, 2005, vol.41, no.6, pp. 937–951.
 Greve, Martin and Ulas Özdemir and Raoul Motika, eds. 2020. Aesthetic and Performative Dimensions of Alevi Cultural Heritage. Ergon Verlag. 215 pages. 
 Koçan, Gürcan/Öncü, Ahmet (2004) "Citizen Alevi in Turkey: Beyond Confirmation and Denial." Journal of Historical Sociology, 17/4, pp. 464–489.
 Olsson, Tord & Elizabeth Özdalga/Catharina Raudvere, eds. (1998). Alevi Identity: Cultural, Religious and Social Perspectives. Istanbul: Swedish Research Institute.
 Stokes, Martin (1996). "Ritual, Identity and the State: An Alevi (Shi’a) Cem Ceremony."In Kirsten E. Schulze et al. (eds.), Nationalism, Minorities and Diasporas: Identities and Rights in the Middle East,, pp. 194–196.
 Vorhoff, Karin (1995). Zwischen Glaube, Nation und neuer Gemeinschaft: Alevitische Identität in der Türkei der Gegenwart. Berlin.

Alevism in Europe
 Geaves, Ron (2003) "Religion and Ethnicity: Community Formation in the British Alevi Community." Koninklijke Brill NV 50, pp. 52– 70.
 Kosnick, Kira (2004) "‘Speaking in One’s Own Voice’: Representational Strategies of Alevi Turkish Migrants on Open-Access Television in Berlin." Journal of Ethnic and Migration Studies, 30/5, pp. 979–994.
 Massicard, Elise (2003) "Alevist Movements at Home and Abroad: Mobilization Spaces and Disjunction." New Perspective on Turkey, 28, pp. 163–188.
 Rigoni, Isabelle (2003) "Alevis in Europe: A Narrow Path towards Visibility." In: Paul J. White/Joost Jongerden (eds.) Turkey's Alevi Enigma: A Comprehensive Overview, Leiden: Brill, pp. 159–173.
 Sökefeld, Martin (2002) "Alevi Dedes in the German Diaspora: The Transformation of a Religious Institution." Zeitschrift für Ethnologie, 127, pp. 163–189.
 Sökefeld, Martin (2004) "Alevis in Germany and the Question of Integration" paper presented at the Conference on the Integration of Immigrants from Turkey in Austria, Germany and Holland, Boğaziçi University, Istanbul, February 27–28, 2004.
 Sökefeld, Martin & Suzanne Schwalgin (2000). "Institutions and their Agents in Diaspora: A Comparison of Armenians in Athens and Alevis in Germany." Paper presented at the sixth European Association of Social Anthropologist Conference, Krakau.
 Thomä-Venske, Hanns (1990). "The Religious Life of Muslim in Berlin." In: Thomas Gerholm/Yngve Georg Lithman (eds.) The New Islamic Presence in Western Europe, New York: Mansell, pp. 78–87.
 Wilpert, Czarina (1990) "Religion and Ethnicity: Orientations, Perceptions and Strategies among Turkish Alevi and Sunni Migrants in Berlin." In: Thomas Gerholm/Yngve Georg Lithman (eds.) The New Islamic Presence in Western Europe. New York: Mansell, pp. 88–106.
 Zirh, Besim Can (2008) "Euro-Alevis: From Gastarbeiter to Transnational Community." In: Anghel, Gerharz, Rescher and Salzbrunn (eds.) The Making of World Society: Perspectives from Transnational Research. Transcript; 103–130.

Bibliographies
 Vorhoff, Karin. (1998), "Academic and Journalistic Publications on the Alevi and Bektashi of Turkey." In: Tord Olsson/Elizabeth Özdalga/Catharina Raudvere (eds.) Alevi Identity: Cultural, Religious and Social Perspectives, Istanbul: Swedish Research Institute, pp. 23–50.

Turkish-language works
 Ata, Kelime. (2007), Alevilerin İlk Siyasal Denemesi: (Türkiye Birlik Partisi) (1966–1980). Ankara: Kelime Yayınevi.
 Aydın, Ayhan. (2008), Abidin Özgünay: Yazar Yayıncı ve Cem Dergisi Kurucusu. İstanbul: Niyaz Yayınları.
 Balkız, Ali. (1999), Sivas’tan Sydney’e Pir Sultan. Ankara: İtalik.
 Balkız, Ali. (2002), Pir Sultan’da Birlik Mücadelesi (Hızır Paşalar’a Yanıt). Ankara: İtalik.
 Bilgöl, Hıdır Ali. (1996), Aleviler ve Canlı Fotoğraflar, Alev Yayınları.
 Coşkun, Zeki (1995) Aleviler, Sünniler ve ... Öteki Sivas, Istanbul: İletişim Yayınları.
 Dumont, Paul. (1997), "Günümüz Türkiye’sinde Aleviliğin Önemi" içinde Aynayı Yüzüme Ali Göründü Gözüme: Yabancı Araştırmacıların Gözüyle Alevilik, editör: İlhan Cem Erseven. İsntabul: Ant, 141–161.
 Engin, Havva ve Engin, Ismail (2004). Alevilik. Istanbul: Kitap Yayınevi.
 Gül, Zeynel. (1995), Yol muyuz Yolcu muyuz? İstanbul: Can Yayınları.
 Gül, Zeynel. (1999), Dernekten Partiye: Avrupa Alevi Örgütlenmesi. Ankara: İtalik.
 Güler, Sabır. (2008), Aleviliğin Siyasal Örgütlenmesi: Modernleşme, Çözülme ve Türkiye Birlik Partisi. Ankara: Dipnot.
 İrat, Ali Murat. (2008), Devletin Bektaşi Hırkası / Devlet, Aleviler ve Ötekiler. İstanbul: Chiviyazıları.
 Kaleli, Lütfü. (2000), "1964–1997 Yılları Arasında Alevi Örgütleri" içinde Aleviler/Alewiten: Kimlik ve Tarih/ Indentität und Geschichte, editörler: İsmail Engin ve Erhard Franz. Hamburg: Deutsches Orient-Institut, 223–241.
 Kaleli, Lütfü. (2000), Alevi Kimliği ve Alevi Örgütlenmeri. İstanbul: Can Yayınları.
 Kaplan, İsmail. (2000), "Avrupa’daki Alevi Örgütlenmesine Bakış" içinde Aleviler/Alewiten: Kimlik ve Tarih/ Indentität und Geschichte, editörler: İsmail Engin ve Erhard Franz. Hamburg: Deutsches Orient-Institut, 241–260.
 Kaplan, İsmail. (2009), Alevice: İnancımız ve Direncimiz. Köln: AABF Yayınları.
 Kocadağ, Burhan. (1996), Alevi Bektaşi Tarihi. İstanbul: Can Yayınları.
 Massicard, Elise. (2007), Alevi Hareketinin Siyasallaşması. İstanbul: İletişim.
 Melikoff, Irene. (1993), Uyur İdik Uyardılar. İstanbul: Cem Yayınevi.
 Okan, Murat. (2004), Türkiye’de Alevilik / Antropolojik Bir Yaklaşım. Ankara: İmge.
 Özerol, Süleyman. (2009), Hasan Nedim Şahhüseyinoğlu. Ankara: Ürün.
 Şahhüseyinoğlu, H. Nedim. (2001), Hızır Paşalar: Bir İhracın Perde Arkası. Ankara: İtalik.
 Şahhüseyinoğlu, Nedim. (1997), Pir Sultan Kültür Derneği’nin Demokrasi Laiklik ve Özgürlük Mücadelesi. Ankara: PSAKD Yayınları.
 Şahhüseyinoğlu, Nedim. (2001), Alevi Örgütlerinin Tarihsel Süreci. Ankara: İtalik.
 Salman, Meral. 2006, Müze Duvarlarına Sığmayan Dergah: Alevi – Bektaşi Kimliğinin Kuruluş Sürecinde Hacı Bektaş Veli Anma Görenleri. Ankara: Kalan.
 Saraç, Necdet. (2010), Alevilerin Siyasal Tarihi. İstanbul: Cem.
 Şener, Cemal ve Miyase İlknur. (1995), Şeriat ve Alevilik: Kırklar Meclisi’nden Günümüze Alevi Örgütlenmesi. İstanbul: Ant.
 Tosun, Halis. (2002), Alevi Kimliğiyle Yaşamak. İstanbul: Can Yayınları.
 Vergin, Nur (2000, [1981]), Din, Toplum ve Siyasal Sistem, İstanbul: Bağlam.
 Yaman, Ali (2000) "Anadolu Aleviliği’nde Ocak Sistemi Ve Dedelik Kurumu." Alevi Bektaşi.
 Zırh, Besim Can. (2005), "Avro-Aleviler: Ziyaretçi İşçilikten Ulus-aşırı Topluluğa" Kırkbudak 2: 31–58.
 Zırh, Besim Can. (2006), "Avrupa Alevi Konfederasyonu Turgut Öker ile Görüşme" Kırkbudak 2: 51–71.

External links 

 Official Alevi-Bektashi Order of Derwishes website 
 A Sufi Metamorphosis: Imam Ali
 History of Sufism / Islamic Mysticism and the importance of Ali
 Alevis 
 Alevi Bektaşi Research Site 
 Semah from a TV show (YouTube)
 Semah – several samples (YouTube)

 
Alevis
Shia Islam in Turkey
Liberal and progressive movements within Islam
 
Shia Sufi orders
Shia Islamic branches